Stefan Milošević (Montenegrin Cyrillic: Стефан Милошевић; born 23 June 1996) is a Montenegrin professional footballer who plays as a striker for Liga I club UTA Arad.

Club career

Iskra
Milošević had his breakout season with Iskra in the summer of 2018 under coach Aleksandar Nedović. On August 25, 2018, he scored a brace in a 1–2 away win against Sutjeska. It was Sutjeska's first loss of the season. Over the course of half a season, Milošević scored nine goals in 18 games for Iskra, and was the highest scorer in the Montenegrin First League during the 2018-19 winter break.

Waasland-Beveren
On 15 January 2019, Milošević signed a 3.5-year contract with Waasland-Beveren. On 17 March 2019, he scored a hat-trick against Standard Liège.

Ironi Kiryat Shmona
On 4 August 2021, Milošević signed for the Israeli Premier League club Ironi Kiryat Shmona.

UTA Arad
On 3 January 2023, Milosevic signed for Liga I club UTA Arad.

International career
Milošević made his debut for the Montenegro national team in a friendly 0–0 tie with Bosnia and Herzegovina on 2 June 2021.

International stats

Honours

Riga FC
Virslīga: 2020

Budućnost
Montenegrin Cup: 2021–22

Individual
Virslīga top scorer: 2021 (13 goals)

References

1996 births
Living people
Footballers from Nikšić
Association football forwards
Montenegrin footballers
Montenegro international footballers
FK Budućnost Podgorica players
FK Rudar Pljevlja players
FK Lovćen players
FK Kom players
FK Iskra Danilovgrad players
S.K. Beveren players
Riga FC players
Hapoel Ironi Kiryat Shmona F.C. players
FC UTA Arad players
Montenegrin First League players
Belgian Pro League players
Latvian Higher League players
Israeli Premier League players
Liga I players
Montenegrin expatriate footballers
Expatriate footballers in Belgium
Expatriate footballers in Latvia
Expatriate footballers in Israel
Expatriate footballers in Romania
Montenegrin expatriate sportspeople in Belgium
Montenegrin expatriate sportspeople in Latvia
Montenegrin expatriate sportspeople in Israel
Montenegrin expatriate sportspeople in Romania